Arthur Barry Still (born December 5, 1955) is a former American football defensive end in the National Football League. He played college football at the University of Kentucky, where he was an All-American in 1977, and professionally for the Kansas City Chiefs (1978–1987) and the Buffalo Bills (1988–1989).

College career
Still played at Kentucky under head coach Fran Curci and led the defense on the 1977 Kentucky Wildcats football team that finished 10-1 and ranked #6 in the final AP poll. On January 9, 2015, the National Football Foundation announced that Still would be inducted into the College Football Hall of Fame.

NFL career
Still was the second overall player taken in the 1978 NFL Draft and became an immediate starter for the Chiefs, making the NFL All-Rookie Team in 1978. In 1979 Still began to get more notice and was voted Second-team All-AFC by UPI. In 1980, Still recorded  sacks was voted All-Pro and All-AFC as well as being named to the Pro Bowl. The following year, 1981, he was voted to his second Pro Bowl. In 1982, he made it three Pro Bowls in a row and was voted second-team All-AFC. In 1983 Still went on an all-vegetarian diet and played at 235 pounds, and it seemingly broke his string of post-season honors in the NFL. In 1984, he was back to 265 pounds and was Second-team All-Pro and a Pro Bowler. He tied his career high of  sacks. In 1985, he played solidly but failed to make any All-Pro or All-AFC teams. However, in 1986 he recorded  sacks and was named First-team All-AFC as the Chiefs made the playoffs.

Still was a 4-time Pro Bowl selection, following the 1980-1982 and 1984 seasons, named the Kansas City Chiefs's Most Valuable Player twice (1980 and 1984). Still is third on the Chiefs all-time sack list with 48.5 and has also made 922 tackles and 11 fumble recoveries. He led the team in sacks on 6 occasions, twice registering  in a season and topped the team's tackle chart 3 times. He was traded to the Buffalo Bills in 1988 and played there for 2 seasons.

Personal life
Art Still's younger sister, Valerie Still, is the all-time leading scorer and rebounder in University of Kentucky basketball history among men and women. His cousin is former Houston Texans defensive tackle Devon Still. He also has two sons and a daughter who are Kansas City Missouri fire fighters.

References

External links
http://www.pro-football-reference.com/players/S/StilAr00.htm

1955 births
Living people
American football defensive ends
Buffalo Bills players
Kansas City Chiefs players
Kentucky Wildcats football players
All-American college football players
American Conference Pro Bowl players
Camden High School (New Jersey) alumni
Players of American football from Camden, New Jersey